Peace Wapiti Public School Division No. 76 or Peace Wapiti Public School Division is a public school authority within the Canadian province of Alberta operated out of Grande Prairie. Peace Wapiti Public School Division provides service to more than 6,000 students in Kindergarten through Grade 12 in 32 schools, including seven Hutterite colony schools and an outreach and online school – Peace Academy of Virtual Education (PAVE) located in Spirit River. High School programs are operated in eight schools – Spirit River Regional Academy, Beaverlodge Regional High School, Eaglesham School, Ridgevalley School, Savanna School, Sexsmith Secondary School, Peace Wapiti Academy and Peace Academy of Virtual Education (PAVE). The Board also operates a group home facility serving students in Northern Alberta.

See also 
List of school authorities in Alberta

References

External links 

 
Grande Prairie
School districts in Alberta